is a railway station in Nemuro, Hokkaido. The station is the eastern terminus of the Nemuro Main Line and the easternmost staffed railway station in Japan.

Layout
Nemuro Station has a single side platform.

Platforms

Adjacent stations

Bus service 
The station serves as Nemuro's central bus terminal, with scheduled overnight service to Sapporo via Nakashibetsu, two or three daily services to Kushiro, and multiple daily services to Nakashibetsu Airport, as well as local bus routes. Sightseeing buses operate to Cape Nosappu during summer months.

History 
The station opened on August 5, 1921. It was the easternmost train station in Japan from 1921 to 1929, when a new railway opened to Habomai on the Nemuro Peninsula, and again from 1959, when the Habomai railway closed, until 1961, when Higashi-Nemuro Station opened on the eastern approach to Nemuro.

See also 
 List of railway stations in Japan

References

Railway stations in Hokkaido Prefecture
Stations of Hokkaido Railway Company
Railway stations in Japan opened in 1921
Nemuro, Hokkaido